The Way It Is is the fourteenth studio album by Australian country music artist John Williamson. The album was released in July 1999, peaked at number 10 on the ARIA Charts and was certified platinum.

At the Country Music Awards of Australia in January 200, the album won 'Top Selling Album'. "Campfire on the Road" won Heritage Song of the Year and "Three Sons" won Bush Ballad of the Year.

At the ARIA Music Awards of 2000, the album was nominated for ARIA Award for Best Country Album.

Track listing

Charts

Weekly charts

Year-end charts

Certifications

Release history

References

1999 albums
John Williamson (singer) albums
EMI Records albums